Chief Mbazulike Amaechi  (16 June 1929 – 1 November 2022) also known as The Boy Is Good was a Nigerian elder statesman.

He served as the first Minister of Aviation during the First Republic in Nigeria.
He was a leading figure of the Zikist Movement. After the ban of the movement, he became the Secretary General of NCNC Youth, a youth wing of NCNC. 

Amaechi was born and died in his hometown of Ukpor, on 1 November 2022, at the age of 93.

References 

1929 births
2022 deaths
Aviation ministers of Nigeria
Igbo people
People from Anambra State